Wang Jingchong may refer to:

Wang Jingchong (Tang dynasty) (847–883), military general and de facto independent ruler of Chengde during the late Tang dynasty
Wang Jingchong (Five Dynasties) (died 950), military general under the Later Jin and Later Han dynasties, unsuccessfully rebelled against Later Han